Booth review or Booth Review may refer to:

Chicago Booth Review, published by the University of Chicago Booth School of Business
Instant replay; specifically,
 Instant replay in football officiating, when initiated by the Replay Assistant, as opposed to a coach's challenge.

See also
 Instant replay (disambiguation)